NERV may refer to:

 NERV, a fictional organization in the Neon Genesis Evangelion franchise
 NERV (reactor), Natural Endogeneous Respiration Vessel

See also 

Nerf, a popular brand of toys
Nerve, a part of the nervous system
Nerve (disambiguation)